The Disco of Love is a 1980 Argentine film written and directed by Adolfo Aristarain. Part of the detective genre, the film stars Cacho Castaña and Ricardo Darín.

Cast

References

External links 
 

1980 films
Argentine romantic comedy films
1980s Spanish-language films
1980s Argentine films